Potosí Municipality is the capital municipality of the Tomás Frías Province in the Potosí Department in Bolivia. Its seat is Potosí which is the capital of the department as well.

Geography 
The Potosí mountain range traverses the municipality. Some of the highest mountains of the municipality are listed below:

Subdivision 
The municipality consists of the following cantons: 
 Chulchucani
 Wari Wari
 Potosí
 Tarapaya

Demographics 
The people are predominantly indigenous citizens of Quechua descent.

See also 
 Jayaq Mayu
 Khari Khari Lakes
 Tarapaya River

References

External links 

Potosí Municipality: population data and map

Municipalities of Potosí Department